Jabbar Feli (Persian: جبار فعلی, born May 8, 1950) is a retired Iranian amateur boxer. He won a silver medal at the 1974 Asian Games and competed at the 1972 Olympics, where he was eliminated in the first bout. At the Asian Championships he won a gold medal in 1973 and a bronze in 1977.

1972 Olympic results
Below is the record of Jabbar Feli, an Iranian featherweight boxer who competed at the 1972 Munich Olympics:

 Round of 64: bye
 lost to Philip Waruinge (Kenya) by decision, 1-4:

References

1950 births
Living people
Boxers at the 1972 Summer Olympics
Olympic boxers of Iran
Iranian male boxers
Medalists at the 1974 Asian Games
Asian Games silver medalists for Iran
Boxers at the 1974 Asian Games
Asian Games medalists in boxing
Featherweight boxers
20th-century Iranian people
21st-century Iranian people